Love It or List It is a home design TV show on HGTV, W Network, and OWN Canada. It is also the original show in the Love it or List It franchise.

The show has run for 18 seasons to date having premiered on September 8, 2008. The 18th season ran from October to December 2021.

In September 2014, the show began filming in North Carolina.

Format

Every episode of Love It or List It follows the same format. A couple or family shows their current house to designer Hilary Farr and real estate agent David Visentin. Hilary redesigns parts of the home based on the desires of the homeowners and their budget and she oversees the renovations and construction. David finds real estate listings that meet the homeowners' needs and budget to convince them to list their current house and buy a new one.

Common challenges that Hilary faces include an inadequate budget to complete the entire request list from the homeowners, often due to discovery of unforeseen issues with the house that are uncovered during the renovation, such as lack of compliance with modern building codes.

Common issues for David, meanwhile, depend on the homeowners' desires; for instance, the couple has children enrolled in the neighborhood school and they do not desire to change, or the potential house is too distant from family members or a workplace. Frequently, David will offer a house significantly outside his given budget, and the homeowners will consider it, or homeowners will outright increase his target; Hilary meets with much more resistance to requests for even small increases in the renovation budget.

After Hilary's renovation is complete, the homeowners are given a tour of their current home to see what she was able to accomplish.

After the tour, David meets with them and hands them an evaluation of the home's current market value following the renovations. He will then remind the couple what they could have in one of the new homes they looked at and that they would not get that in their current home.

The homeowners then meet with Hilary and David, who pose a question to them: The homeowners must choose either to "Love It," meaning that they will continue to live in their current home with the renovations, or to "List It," meaning that they will buy one of the homes David showed them and sell their current home.

At this stage, all else being equal Hilary is at a theoretical disadvantage: Although Hilary's renovations increase the attractiveness of her "Love It" option by improving the current home's livability, they simultaneously increase the attractiveness of David's "List It" option by increasing the current home's resale value and thereby decreasing the net cost of acquiring any given new home that he proposes.

By contrast, David's efforts to maximize the attractiveness of his "List It" option do not provide Hilary any offsetting benefit increasing the attractiveness of her "Love It" option.

After a moment to deliberate, the homeowners reveal their decision and explain their reasoning to Hilary and David. If the homeowners decide to "List It," Hilary generally reacts with equanimity and expresses a desire for their best interest, whereas if they decide to "Love It," David frequently reacts with feigned incredulity, questioning their reasoning and/or giving at least the impression of taking their decision personally.

The parties then bid each other farewell, with closing footage of Hilary and David continuing to react and occasionally continuing their bout of one-upmanship.

Host and crew
Hosts
Hilary Farr – Hilary Farr is a home designer from Toronto, Ontario. She has lived in Australia, England, California, and New York City. Farr honed her skills on properties in Los Angeles, Santa Barbara, New York and Toronto. When she first moved back to Toronto, she became the first designer to "stage" properties for sale. She continues to build and design homes in the downtown core where she herself owns properties.
David Visentin – David Visentin is a real estate agent in Southern Ontario with Country Living Realty Limited. He has been practicing since 1987.
Assistant Designer
Desta Ostapyk (Canadian episodes) – Desta is a Toronto-based designer who graduated in 2004 from the Toronto International Academy of Design and Technology in Interior Design, and has since focused on a career in the Television Industry. She first started working with Big Coat Productions during her last semester of school as an intern for HGTV's hit series My Parents House. She soon became the Design Stylist for the show.
Contractors
Eric Eremita (North Carolina episodes) – General contractor and designer Eric Eremita was selected to be the one and only general contractor on HGTV's Love It or List It U.S. version, after the network took notice of him when he competed in its Brother vs. Brother reality show.
Eddie Richardson (Canadian episodes) – Eddie Richardson was a contractor on Love It or List It who started his own family business. Richardson has also been a pro-beach volleyball player and professional bass fisherman.
Fergus McLaren (Canadian episodes) – Fergus McLaren started up his own construction company, R-Mac Solutions, 10 years ago.

Behind the Scenes
Architect: Simon West
Senior Production Coordinator: Linda Johnstone
Construction Coordinator: David Violante
Construction Lead : Adam Dalgarno
Construction Assistants: Chris Blinn, Ahren Mrowietz, Dale George
Design Coordinator: Kaaveh Shoman

Episodes

Spinoffs

Love It or List It has spawned five spinoffs.

The first, known as Love It or List It Vancouver (or Love it or List it Too in the US), was launched in winter 2012 and is hosted by Jillian Harris and Todd Talbot.

The second spin-off, a British version known as Kirstie and Phil's Love It or List It, debuted in 2015, is hosted by Kirstie Allsopp and Phil Spencer.

The third spin off, Love It or List It Vacation Homes debuted in spring 2016 and is hosted by Dan Vickery and Elisa Goldhawke.

A fourth spin off, Vendre ou renover au Quebec, debuted in January 2017 and is hosted by Maika Desnoyers and Daniel Corbin.

The fifth spin off, Love It Or List It Australia, debuted in September 2017 and is hosted by Andrew Winter and Neale Whittaker.

International syndication

Reception
On August 31, 2010, Love It or List It was nominated for two Gemini Awards: Best Reality Program or Series and Best Direction in a Reality Program or Series. When HGTV premiered the show on the network, the company stated that Love It or List It has been the highest-rated reality series since Candice Olson's Candice Tells All.

In 2012, New York Times' columnist Gail Collins noted that it was US Secretary of State Hillary Clinton's favorite TV show. According to Collins, Clinton finds the show "very calming" after being interviewed about her departure from politics.

In a 2013 interview with Las Vegas Magazine, Vanna White from Wheel of Fortune said it was one of her favorite HGTV programs. Actress Julianne Moore also gave similar praise for the show in an interview with Katie Couric.

According to The Wall Street Journal, the show and its Vancouver spinoff is one of Canada's beloved reality series.

The show has also been referenced in various television sitcoms and films including ABC's The Middle, CBS's Mom and Rebel Wilson's 2019 film Isn't It Romantic.

Controversy
In April 2016, homeowners Deanna Murphy and Tim Sullivan who had participated in a 2015 Love It or List It episode filed suit against production company Big Coat TV, as well as the North Carolina contractor (Aaron Fitz Construction) who had been hired by the show to do the renovations on their home. The couple alleges that the renovation funds that they provided were not properly disbursed, and that the work on their home was done to a substandard quality. Moreover, the lawsuit states that the television personalities on the show do not play an active role in the renovation process, and that they were not shown homes on the market by any licensed North Carolina real estate agent. Big Coat TV has commented that they "do intend to vigorously defend what [they] consider to be false allegations."

The suit was settled in April 2017. The plaintiffs had signed a confidentiality agreement; their lawyer would not comment on the settlement. Big Coat had previously filed a countersuit for libel, slander and product disparagement; parts of that suit had been dismissed by the time of the settlement but that was under appeal by Big Coat. After the agreements had been concluded, both suits were dismissed.

References

External links
 Love It or List It on HGTV
 Love It or List It on W Network
 Love It or List It at the Internet Movie Database

 
2000s Canadian reality television series
2008 Canadian television series debuts
2010s Canadian reality television series
2020s Canadian reality television series
Television shows filmed in Toronto
W Network original programming